A municipal corporation is the legal term for a local governing body, including (but not necessarily limited to) cities, counties, towns, townships, charter townships, villages, and boroughs. The term can also be used to describe municipally owned corporations.

Municipal corporation as local self-government

Municipal incorporation occurs when such municipalities become self-governing entities under the laws of the state or province in which they are located. Often, this event is marked by the award or declaration of a municipal charter. A city charter or town charter or municipal charter is a legal document establishing a municipality, such as a city or town.

Canada

In Canada, charters are granted by provincial authorities.

India

The Corporation of Chennai is the oldest Municipal Corporation in the world outside the United Kingdom.

Ireland

The title "corporation" was used in boroughs from soon after the Norman conquest until the Local Government Act 2001. Under the 2001 act, county boroughs were renamed "cities" and their corporations became "city councils"; other borough corporations were renamed "borough councils".

After the Partition of Ireland, the corporations in the Irish Free State were Dublin, Cork, Limerick and Waterford (county boroughs) and Drogheda, Kilkenny, Sligo, Clonmel, and Wexford (non-county boroughs). Dún Laoghaire gained borough status in 1930 as "The Corporation of Dun Laoghaire". Galway's borough status, lost in 1840, was restored in 1937; it was formally styled "the Mayor, Aldermen and Burgesses of the Borough of Galway", but referred to as "the Corporation".

New Zealand

The New Zealand Constitution Act 1852 allowed municipal corporations to be established within the new Provinces of New Zealand. The term fell out of favour following the abolition of the Provinces in 1876.

United Kingdom

The ancient boroughs of England and Wales were typically incorporated by a royal charter, though some were boroughs by prescription. The Municipal Corporations Act 1835 and Municipal Corporations Act 1882 abolished the corporations of rotten boroughs and other small rural areas. The Local Government Act 1888 aligned the powers of the remaining borough corporations with those of the new urban district councils. All borough corporations were replaced under the Local Government Act 1972 with councils not designated as "corporations", with the exception of the City of London Corporation.

The corporations of the burghs of Scotland were similar in origin and were reformed or replaced in the nineteenth century before being abolished by the Local Government (Scotland) Act 1973. The Irish borough corporations within what is now Northern Ireland were reformed by the Municipal Corporations (Ireland) Act 1840 and Local Government (Ireland) Act 1898 and replaced by the Local Government Act (Northern Ireland) 1972.

United States

Municipal corporations as enterprises

According to one definition of the term, municipal corporations are "organisations with independent corporate status, managed by an executive board appointed primarily by local government officials, and with majority public ownership". Some such corporations rely on revenue from user fees, distinguishing them from agencies and special districts funded through taxation, although this is not always the case. Such municipal corporations result from a process of "externalization", and require different skills and orientations from the respective local governments, and follow common changes in the institutional landscape of public services. They are argued to be more efficient than government bureaucracies, but have higher failure rates because of their legal and managerial autonomy.

See also
 German town law
 Unincorporated area
 Municipality

References

External links

Municipal incorporation

 "Characteristics and State Requirements for Incorporated Places" - United States Census

Municipal disincorporation/dissolution

 "Municipal Disincorporation in California" - California City Finance

Government corporations
Types of business entity
Urban planning